Kenny Live is a televised talk show presented by Pat Kenny on Raidió Teilifís Éireann (RTÉ). The show debuted in 1988 and aired every Saturday night, except during the summer months, directly after the main evening news. In 1999 Kenny Live came to an end when Kenny succeeded Gay Byrne as host of The Late Late Show.

History
Following the departure of The Late Late Show to Friday nights in 1985, RTÉ were left with a gap in their Saturday night schedule.  In 1986 a new chat show called Saturday Live was devised to fill the void.  The new show, which featured a different guest presenter every week, ran for two series from 1986 to 1988, however, it proved unpopular. For their autumn schedule in 1988 RTÉ devised a new chat show with a permanent host. Mike Murphy was rumoured to be the host, however, in the end the job went to Pat Kenny.  Since the late 1970s Kenny had been more associated with current affairs broadcasting, having presented Today Tonight, however, he also showed that he could handle light entertainment when he co-hosted the 1988 Eurovision Song Contest.  Kenny had also hosted an edition of Saturday Live which proved successful.

Production
The first six series of Kenny Live were broadcast from Studio 1 in the RTÉ Television Centre at Donnybrook, Dublin 4.  That studio was also home to the show's Friday night rival The Late Late Show.  As RTÉ's biggest at the time, the studio held 120 audience members.  In 1995 the show moved to Studio 4, a new studio specifically adapted to cater for large productions.  The size of the audience also more than doubled to 250.

Kenny takes over The Late Late Show
In 1999 Gay Byrne retired as host of The Late Late Show.  There was some speculation as to whether the show would also be retired with Byrne, with Kenny simply transferring Kenny Live to the vacant Friday night slot.  In the end it was realised that The Late Late Show was too successful a franchise to end as it had dominated RTÉ's ratings viewership figures, coming in consistently either at number 1 or number 2.  Because of this Kenny Live was put "on ice" and Kenny became host of The Late Late Show.

Format
Kenny Live featured guest interviews and live music from guest music groups and featured a mix of serious discussion and light chat aimed at a younger audience than its main rival The Late Late Show.

Online on RTE Player in 2022 for 60 Years of television.

References

1988 Irish television series debuts
1999 Irish television series endings
1980s Irish television series
1990s Irish television series
Irish television talk shows
RTÉ original programming